Too Late the Hero may refer to:
 Too Late the Hero (film), a 1970 film by Robert Aldrich  starring Michael Caine and Henry Fonda
 Too Late the Hero (album), a 1981 album by John Entwistle featuring Joe Walsh
 "Too Late the Hero" (song), a 1981 song by John Entwistle from the album of the same name